William Dubilier (July 25, 1888 – July 25, 1969) was an American inventor in the field of radio and electronics. He demonstrated radio communication at Seattle's Alaska–Yukon–Pacific Exposition on June 21, 1909; ten years before the first commercial station operated. A graduate of Cooper Union, he was the first to use sheets of naturally occurring mica as the dielectric in a capacitor. Mica capacitors were widely used in early radio oscillator and tuning circuits because the temperature coefficient of expansion of mica was low, resulting in very stable capacitance – mica capacitors are still used where exceptional temperature stability is needed.

He founded the Dubilier Condenser Company in New York in 1920. His son Martin H. Dubilier also became a prominent inventor and company founder.

References

1888 births
1969 deaths
20th-century American inventors
History of radio
Cooper Union alumni